Police memorabilia collecting is a hobby involving the collection and trading of law enforcement-related items such as patches, badges, uniforms, equipment, hats, helmets, training manuals, medals, and decommissioned or restored police cars. Memorabilia generally focuses on collecting historical artifacts such as turn-of-the-century screw-based handcuffs, though it can also include collecting modern items, typically those that have been decommissioned.

Public collection 

In the United States, many laws have been enacted which control possession of law enforcement insignia for security purposes, and this has impacted civilian collecting because they do not want the patches to be given to anyone other than law enforcement officers. In addition to this, patch reproductions have also become a problem amongst collectors, and most serious historians regard the reproductions as having no value. Various organizations, such as the California Law Enforcement Historical Society, sponsor annual events which spotlight the historical significance of preserving accurate information for future generations. West Virginia Law prohibits trading patches, though North Carolina law prohibits departments selling patches.

Though many do not trade or give away patches, some police departments sell their patches for new equipment, charity, or for a police explorer program.

Between agencies 

Police memorabilia is also exchanged between police forces themselves. The exchange of patches has begun to be seen as a sign of respect and cooperation between agencies since patches came into more common use in the 1920s for agency identity.

With the development of more modern communication between various law enforcement agencies, the trading of insignia has become widespread. One particular example can be seen at the NYPD's New York City Police Museum in New York City, where hundreds of police badges and patches are on display, including those from other American forces, and all constabularies of the United Kingdom, as well as forces from South East Asia and Australia.

Museums

See also 

 Patch collecting
 Police rank
 Souvenir
 United States law enforcement decorations

Notes

Further reading

Police Collectors News, Baldwin, Wisconsin, first printed in 1986, monthly 
Police Insignia Collectors Association Magazine (begun in 1974), monthly 
The Encyclopedia of Federal Law Enforcement Patches Raymond Sherrard (2000)
Sheriff's insignia of the United States James V. Claflin (1997)
The California Patch Book Randall Grago (1996)

Collecting
Law enforcement